The Electoral division of Meander was an electoral division in the Tasmanian Legislative Council of Australia. It existed from 1856 to 1997, when it was renamed Leven.

Members

See also
Tasmanian Legislative Council electoral divisions

References
Past election results for Meander

Former electoral districts of Tasmania
1997 disestablishments in Australia